Zoványi  Pipis  György (1656 – 1758) was a Hungarian bishop of Debrecen, involved in the Kuruc uprising.

He served at the Reformed Church, Zalău after 1712. His house is one of the oldest one from Zalău. On 9 November 1714, Charles XII of Sweden rested for a night in Zalău at the house of György Zoványi, as indicates a board on the house.

References

External links 
 Zalău, Zoványi house
  Zoványi  Pipis  György(1666-1758) 
  Petri Mór, Zoványi

Hungarian nobility
1656 births
1758 deaths
Hungarian Calvinist and Reformed Christians